The Oath of Black Blood is a compilation album by the Finnish black metal band Beherit. The album is not a separate recording, but a compilation of the band's demo Demonomancy and EP Dawn of Satan's Millennium. The material was recorded in late 1990 and released as an album in 1991 through Turbo Music, without Beherit's permission, after the band spent the recording budget on alcohol. Spikefarm Records re-released the album in 2005 in digipak format with different artwork.

Track listing
 "Intro" – 0:57 
 "Metal of Death" – 0:54
 "The Oath of Black Blood" – 2:41
 "Grave Desecration" – 2:02
 "Witchcraft" – 3:13
 "Goat Worship" – 1:55
 "Demonomancy" – 2:22
 "Black Mass Prayer" – 1:15
 "Beast of Damnation" – 4:07
 "Hail Sathanas" – 1:47
 "Dawn of Satan's Millennium" – 4:46

Credits
 Nuclear Holocausto – vocals, guitars
 Black Jesus – bass
 Necroperversor – drums

External links

The Oath of Black Blood at Discogs
The Oath of Black Blood at Encyclopaedia Metallum

1991 albums
Beherit albums
Season of Mist albums